Salina is a village in Malta. Salina borders Baħar iċ-Ċagħaq, Magħtab, Naxxar and St. Paul's Bay. Salina is mostly known for its salt pans and the Salina Catacombs. The word salini means salt pans in Maltese.

Zones in Is-Salini
Tal-Latmija
Salini Bay
San Mikiel

References 

Populated places in Malta
Naxxar